Sukanya Samriddhi Account (Girl Child Prosperity Account) is a Government of India backed saving scheme targeted at the parents of girl children. The scheme encourages parents to build a fund for the future education of their female child.

The scheme was launched by Prime Minister Narendra Modi on 22 January 2015 as a part of the Beti Bachao, Beti Padhao campaign. The scheme currently provides an interest rate of 7.6% (for Apr-July 2021 quarter) and tax benefits. The account can be opened at any India Post office or branch of authorised commercial banks. 

The Sukanya Samriddhi Account Rules, 2016 was rescinded on 12 December 2019 and the new Sukanya Samriddhi Account Scheme, 2019 was introduced.

Summary
The scheme was launched by Prime Minister Narendra Modi on 22 January 2015 in Panipat, Haryana. The accounts can be opened at any India Post office or a branch of some authorised commercial banks. 
Initially, the interest rate was set at 9.1% but later revised to 9.2% in late March 2015 for FY2015-16. Interest Rate have been revised for FY 2021-22 to 7.6%.

The account can be opened anytime between the birth of a girl child and the time she attains 10 years age by the parent/guardian. Only one account is allowed per child. Parents can open a maximum of two accounts for each of their children (exception allowed for twins and triplets). The account can be transferred to anywhere in India.

A minimum of  must be deposited in the account initially. Thereafter, any amount in multiples of Rs 100 can be deposited.

The girl can operate her account after she reaches the age of 10. The account allows 50% withdrawal at the age of 18 for higher education purposes. The account reaches maturity after time period of 21 years from date of opening it. Deposits in the account can be made till the completion of 15 years, from the date of the opening of the account. After this period the account will earn only applicable rate of interest. If the account is closed, then it will not earn interest at the prevailing rate.  If the girl is over 18 and married, normal closure is allowed.

No of subscribers

List of states with highest number of accounts as on 31 October 2021

Interest rates revisions

Tax benefits
However, Finance Minister Arun Jaitley announced, during the 2015 Union Budget, tax exemption on the interest from the account and on withdrawal from the fund after maturity, making the tax benefits similar to that of the Public Provident Fund. These changes were applied retrospectively from 1 April 2015. These benefits will be reassessed annually.

Eligibility

For the child (account holder)

 Only a girl child can avail the benefits of Sukanya Samriddhi Yojana saving scheme.
 The maximum age of this child should be 10 years. However a grace period of 1 year is granted.

For the parents-

 Only biological parents or legal guardians of a girl child can open the account on the child's behalf.
 One parent or legal guardian can open up to two accounts for their girl children. 
In case of twins or triplets the parent or legal guardian can open up to three accounts.
The account holder has to be an Indian citizen and resident in India at the time of account opening and has to remain so until maturity or closure of account.

Reception
By mid-March 2015, within 2 months of launch, 1,80,000 accounts had been opened under the scheme. Karnataka, Tamil Nadu and Andhra Pradesh reported highest number of new accounts.
The number of accounts opened up to October, 2015 under Sukanya Samriddhi Yojana across the country is 76,19,668. The impact is that 76,19,668 girl children got  deposited in their name.

Maturity

 The Account shall mature on completion of a period of twenty-one years from the date of its opening:
Provided that the final closure in the Account may be permitted before completion of such period of twenty one years, if the account holder, on an application, makes a request for such premature closure for reasons of intended marriage of the Account holder and on furnishing of age proof confirming that the applicant will not be less than eighteen years of age on the date of marriage:

Provided that no such premature closure shall be made before one month preceding the date of the marriage or after three months from the date of such marriage.

 On maturity, the balance including interest outstanding in the Account shall be payable to the Account holder, on an application by the Account holder for closure of the Account, and on furnishing documentary proof of her identity, residence and citizenship.

 No interest shall be payable once the Account completes twenty-one years from the date of its opening.

Partial Withdrawal
To satisfy the financial needs that the account holder must meet to pursue higher studies, the withdrawal of 50% of the balance to the account’s balance at the close of the previous financial year is permitted.

But, withdrawals can be allowed only after the account holder is age 18 or is in the 10th standard or earlier.

It is not only an application in writing and documentary proof in the form of a valid admissions offer from an educational institution or an demand from the institution confirming that the financial requirements are necessary.

The withdrawal amount is limited to the actual amount of fees and other charges required to be paid at the time of entry, as stated in the offer of admission or on the appropriate fee slip that the institution/college issues.

The withdrawal may be made as a lump sum or in instalments of not more than once per year, maximum five years, subject to a maximum amount confirmed by the institution/college of education.

Early Withdrawal
In the event of the account owner’s death, your account is closed as soon as the authority in charge presents the death certificate.

The balance on your account will be paid together with interest due until the date of death in the guardian’s name.

If the registered girl child dies, parents or legal guardians may be entitled to the amount remaining on the account and accrued interest.

The money will be transferred to the person who is the nominee for the account right away. Additionally, parents or legal guardianship representatives must provide the valid documents confirming your account holder’s death, signed by the authorities concerned.

The interest rate for the period between the dates of death and the closing date of the account will be the interest rate that applies to savings accounts at the post office for balances in the Sukanya Samriddhi Account.

Transfer of account 

(1) The Account may be transferred anywhere in India and from or to post offices and from or to Banks and between post office and Bank, free of cost on furnishing of proof of shifting of residence of either the guardian or the Account holder and otherwise, on payment of a fees of one hundred rupees to the post office or the Bank to which the transfer is made.

(2) The process of transfer of the account shall be effected electronically if the post office or the Bank concerned, has access to the facility of CBS.

References

Government schemes in India
Modi administration initiatives
Tax-advantaged savings plans in India
Women's rights in India
Postal savings system
Postal system of India
2015 establishments in India